Listing may refer to:
 Enumeration of a set of items in the form of a list
 Listing (computer), a computer code listing
 Listing (finance), the placing of a company's shares on the list of stocks traded on a stock exchange
 Johann Benedict Listing (1808–1882), German mathematician
 Navigation listing, tilting of vessels in a nautical context
 Listings magazine, a type of magazine displaying a schedule of programmed content
 Designation as a listed building in the United Kingdom
 A term in US real estate brokerage, referring to the obtaining of a written contract to represent the seller of a property or business

See also
List (disambiguation)